Nassarius biendongensis is a species of sea snail, a marine gastropod mollusc in the family Nassariidae, the Nassa mud snails or dog whelks.

Description
The length of the shell varies between 9.7 mm and 14.5 mm.

Distribution
This species occurs in the South China Sea.

References

 Bouchet, P.; Fontaine, B. (2009). List of new marine species described between 2002–2006. Census of Marine Life.

Nassariidae
Gastropods described in 2003